Kola may refer to:

People
 Koła, a Polish noble family
 Kola people, Gabonese pygmies
 Kola or Kula people (Asia) of Cambodia and Thailand
 Gyele people, also known as the Kola, Cameroonian pygmies
 Rodgers Kola (born 1989), Zambian footballer

Places
 Kola Peninsula, a peninsula in the far north of Russia
 Kola Bay, also known as Kola Inlet, a fjord in Murmansk Oblast, Russia on the Kola Peninsula
 Kola (river), a river in Murmansk Oblast, Russia on the Kola Peninsula
 Kola, Russia, a town in Murmansk Oblast, Russia on the Kola Peninsula
 Kola, alternative name of Kula, Iran, a village in East Azerbaijan Province
 Kola (historical region), part of the Georgian Tao-Klarjeti principalities, the contemporary Turkish district Göle
 Kola Island, one of the Aru Islands of Indonesia
 , in southwestern Sri Lanka
 Kola, Mali
 Kola, Manitoba, Canada
 Kola, Hooghly, a census town in West Bengal, India
 Kola (Goražde), a village in Bosnia and Herzegovina
 Kola (South Ossetia), a settlement in the Dzau district, South Ossetia

Other uses
 KOLA, a commercial classic hits music radio station in San Bernardino, California
 Kola (dance), a Belarusian folk dance
 "Kola" (song), a 1997 song by rock band The Rasmus
 Kola, a Russian Altay-class oiler
 Kola language, a language spoken on Kola Island
 Kola Nuclear Power Plant, a plant in Polyarnye Zori, Russia on the Kola Peninsula
 Kola Superdeep Borehole (KSDB), a Russian-funded project to drill into the Earth's crust on the Kola Peninsula
 Kola-class frigate, the NATO reporting name for a group of frigates built for the Soviet Navy in the 1950s

See also
 Kola nut, a genus of about 125 species of trees
 Cola (disambiguation)